The WS2600 is a 22.5 ton 10x8 and 10x10 transporter erector launcher used by the People's Liberation Army Rocket Force of the People's Republic of China. It is, along with the smaller WS2500, one of the principal mobility platforms in mounting China's medium-range ballistic missiles.

It is a general purpose heavy duty missile transporter developed from the original WS2500 and is built by Wanshan Special Vehicle. Its other contemporary is the larger HTF5680A1.

Description
The WS2600 is a heavy duty TEL co-developed by a joint Chinese and Belarusian venture. The WS2600 is slightly bigger than the WS2500 and a larger version of the original WS2400 with an additional axle to support the increased payload.

Due to its larger size, the WS2600 is able to carry much heftier missiles, of which its most common payload is the DF-21C medium-range ballistic missile and the DF-21D anti-ship ballistic missile. Both the WS2500 and WS2600 form one of the main TEL carriers of China's MRBM and ASBM stockpiles.

Like the WS2500, the TEL has a 4-door cab, which allows the WS2600 to easily accommodates the driver and 7 additional passengers.

See also
WS2300
WS2400
WS2500
HTF5680A1

References

Military trucks of China
Military vehicles of the People's Republic of China
Missile launchers